Maa Vintha Gaadha Vinuma is a 2020 Indian Telugu-language romantic drama film directed by Aditya Mandala from a screenplay written by Siddu Jonnalagadda. The film stars Jonnalagadda and Seerat Kapoor while Tanikella Bharani, Shishir Sharma, and Kamal Kamaraju play supporting roles with the music composed by Sricharan PakalaRohitJoy. The film premiered on Aha on 13 November 2020.

Plot

All hell breaks loose when a marriage video of Siddhu and Vineetha goes viral on social media. With chaos and embarrassment in both the families, the couple must sort out all the unpleasant reverberations.

Cast 
Siddu Jonnalagadda as Siddhu
Seerat Kapoor as Vinitha Venugopal
Tanikella Bharani as Police Officer 
Kalpika Ganesh as Meghana
Jayaprakash as Vinitha's father
Shishir Sharma as Siddhu's father
Rajashree as Siddhu's mother
Kamal Kamaraju as Karthik Venugopal
Fish Venkat as himself
Pragathi as Meghana's mother
Viva Harsha as College Senior
C. V. L. Narasimha Rao
Lakshmi Manchu as herself (cameo appearance)

Production 
After working in Krishna and His Leela, Siddu Jonnalagadda and Seerat Kapoor were cast in this film. Kapoor's plays the main character in the film, which is about a couple who attempts to convince their parents to accept their relationship. The post-production of the film was finished in September of 2020.

Soundtracks

Reception 
Jahnavi Reddy of The News Minute rated the film 2.5 out of 5 and called the film "A refurbished version of a coming-of-age romcom." Reddy added that "Although it is funny in parts, and feels very contemporary in a lot of ways, the film is after all, the story of a man-child, and feels like old wine in a new bottle." The Hindu'''s Sangeetha Devi Dundoo wrote that "Maa Vintha… has these small moments of appreciable writing but in the larger picture, is neither entertaining nor does it make us empathise with the couple." The Times of India rated the film 3 out of 5 and termed the film "a fresh and funny love story." 

A reviewer from Andhra Jyothi'' rated the film 2/5 and stated that "Director Aditya failed miserably to deliver the content emotionally."

References

External links 

2020 romantic drama films
Indian romantic drama films
2020 direct-to-video films
2020s Telugu-language films
Aha (streaming service) original films
Films scored by Sricharan Pakala